Joan Cervós Moro (born 24 February 1998) is an Andorran professional footballer who plays as a left-back for First League RS side FK Rudar Prijedor and the Andorra national team.

Club career

Colorado Springs Switchbacks
In January 2020, Cervós joined USL Championship club Colorado Springs Switchbacks FC. He made his league debut for the club in the opening match of the season, playing the entirety of a 2-1 away victory over OKC Energy FC.

International career
Cervós made his international debut for Andorra on 3 June 2018 in a friendly match against Cape Verde. Cervós started the match before coming off in the 90+4th minute for Jordi Rubio, with the match finishing as a 2–4 loss on penalties following a 0–0 draw.

International goal
Scores and results list Andorra's goal tally first.

Career statistics

International

References

External links
 
 
 
 
 Joan Cervós at eu-football.info
 Joan Cervós at worldfootball.com

1998 births
Living people
People from Andorra la Vella
Andorran footballers
Association football fullbacks
Segunda División B players
Tercera División players
FC Andorra players
FC Santboià players
AE Prat players
USL Championship players
Colorado Springs Switchbacks FC players
Andorran expatriate footballers
Expatriate footballers in Spain
Expatriate soccer players in the United States
Andorran expatriate sportspeople in Spain
Andorran expatriate sportspeople in the United States
Andorra youth international footballers
Andorra under-21 international footballers
Andorra international footballers